The 2013 Danish Individual Speedway Championship was the 2013 edition of the Danish Individual Speedway Championship. The final was staged over two rounds, at Slangerup and Holsted, and was won by Niels Kristian Iversen. It was the second time Iversen had won the national title, having also been victorious the year before.

Event format 
The competition started with two semi finals, with five progressing to the final series from each. The final series was held over two rounds, with the top four scorers from the two rounds then competing in a Grand Final. The points from the Grand Final were then added to the total score and the overall winner was the rider with the most total points.

Semi finals

Final series

Final classification

References 

Denmark
2013 in Danish motorsport
Speedway in Denmark